Lalhmangaihsanga "Sena" Ralte (born 6 July 1988) is an Indian professional footballer who plays as a left back for Real Kashmir in the I League.

Career
Born in Mizoram, Sena started his footballing career at the Esthar F Academy.

Royal Wahingdoh
He eventually joined the youth side of I-League 2nd Division side Royal Wahingdoh F.C. and was a part of the youth side that went on a trip to South Africa in March 2014. He then played a part in the senior Royal Wahingdoh side that participated in the 2014 I-League 2nd Division and gained promotion to the I-League.

He then made his professional debut for Royal Wahingdoh in the Federation Cup on 28 December 2014 against Mumbai. He started the match as Royal Wahingdoh won 2–1.

Chennaiyin (loan)
In July 2015 Lalhmangaihsanga was drafted to play for Chennaiyin FC in the 2015 Indian Super League.

DSK Shivajians
On 5 January 2016, Sena Ralte signed for new I-League club DSK Shivajians for 1 season. In whole season he was the instrumental player for the team and a regular starter of the team.

Mumbai City
In July 2016, Ralte signed on the dotted lines for Mumbai City FC for the third season of Hero ISL. He made his debut for Mumbai City In a match where Mumbai City beaten their Arch Rivals FC Pune City by 1-0.

Bengaluru FC (loan)
He was signed on loan from Mumbai City FC for 2016–17 I-League season. Ralte scored his debut goal for Bengaluru against Shillong Lajong from 35 yards.

Delhi Dynamos
Ralte was signed by Delhi Dynamos FC in 2017–18 ISL Players Draft.

ATK
Sena was signed by ATK on a two-year deal.

Career statistics

Honours

Club
Chennaiyin
Indian Super League: 2015
Real Kashmir
IFA Shield: 2020, 2021

References

1988 births
Living people
Indian footballers
Royal Wahingdoh FC players
Association football defenders
Footballers from Mizoram
I-League 2nd Division players
I-League players
Indian Super League players
Chennaiyin FC players
Mumbai City FC players
Bengaluru FC players

External links

 

Real Kashmir FC players
DSK Shivajians FC players
Odisha FC players
ATK (football club) players